Lavatory, Lav, or Lavvy may refer to:

Toilet, the plumbing fixture
Toilet (room), containing a toilet
Public toilet
Aircraft lavatory, the public toilet on an aircraft
Latrine, a rudimentary toilet
A lavatorium, the washing facility in a monastery or other ecclesiastical setting
A sink
A washstand

See also
 Lav (disambiguation)